Tomchei Shabbos is the name for several Jewish charities in different communities, which are not all affiliated with one another.  The Hebrew name means "supporters of the Sabbath."  Thus, the charity's mission is to provide food and other supplies so that poor Jews can celebrate the Sabbath and the Jewish holidays.

Tomchei Shabbos of Rockland County
Tomche Shabbos of Rockland County has been providing food packages to the poor since 1973.
"Today, we are faced with many people in financial distress looking towards us for help. Some have lost jobs, businesses have been closed, illness and disability of the family bread winner have left families in desperate need. Tomche Shabbos of Rockland County responds to these situations with programs that now include job placement and financial counseling, besides the food packages" said Founder Alan Rosenstock. It operates every Thursday night. It has been recorded that Tomche Shabbos of Rockland County gave out 202,256 lbs of chicken in the year of 2013 alone.  They are as well a registered 501(c)_organization

Tomchei Shabbos of Bergen County
Tomchei Shabbos of Bergen County was founded by Chani Schmutter, Lori Frank, and Claire Strauss in Bergen County, New Jersey (Teaneck, Bergenfield, and Fair Lawn) in 1990.  As of 2012, Tomchei Shabbos supported 180 Jewish families in the area.  1

Tomchei Shabbos of Los Angeles
Tomchei Shabbos of Los Angeles was founded by three Orthodox rabbis in 1977.  A 2003 article in the Los Angeles Jewish Journal stated that over 200 Jewish families rely on the volunteer organization for weekly donations.

Founded in 1978. Their mission is to assist the Jewish needy of Los Angeles by providing a variety of family services with the utmost level of dignity and discretion.  Their programs help those without work find jobs, start businesses & earn livelihoods. They provide clothing and furniture, assist with utilities & rent in emergency situations, help children obtain Jewish educations and direct those in need to the proper social service organizations. On a weekly basis they provide food for the week, Shabbat and the holidays. This weekly support restores spirits and allows the Sabbath to work its healing magic on families in need.

As of February 11, 2016 Tomchei Shabbos of Los Angeles is helping close to 1,500 individuals on a weekly basis with food packages and store credit vouchers. They also assist over 2,800 individuals bi-annually with brand new clothing. In addition they assist 25 families monthly with furniture, 100 families monthly with diapers and hundreds of families annually with hardship assistance.

Tomchei Shabbos of Los Angeles is a d/b/a name of Touch of Kindness, a 501(c)(3) organization.

Tomchei Shabbos of Miami
In 2009 Rabbi David Freidman of Miami  took a  couple of Jewish boys to New York. Including Ariel Levy, Daniel Hoffman, David Levy and Roy Cohen.
After going into the city and visiting different museums there was one very unexpected stop, 
Tomchei Shabbos of Rockland County. Baruch Hashem that the bus stopped there to help package the foods on 
Thursday, there was instant inspiration.
In July 2009 after returning from the trip to New York with the help of Ha Kadosh Baruchu 
Tomchei Shabbos of Miami was started.

Tomchei Shabbos of Queens
Founded in 1979 by a group of young men in Forest Hills, and has since moved to Kew Gardens, Queens. It operates every Wednesday night, with volunteers from diverse Jewish backgrounds, arranging food packages which are then delivered to the needy, by many local volunteers. It is currently responsible for the delivery of approximately 350 packages weekly. With its low overhead and no salaries, most of the money goes directly into providing food for community members.

External links
Tomchei Shabbos of Greater Washington (Maryland and Greater Washington Area)
Tomchei Shabbos of Queens (New York City)
Tomchei Shabbos of Los Angeles
Tomchei Shabbos of Toronto
Tomchei Shabbos of Phoenix (Arizona)
Tomchei Shabbos of Miami
Tomchei Shabbos of Passaic
Tomchei Shabbos of Bergen County
Tomchei Shabbos of Rockland County
Tomchei Shabbos of Lakewood

Jewish charities based in the United States